Polignano a Mare is a town and comune in the Metropolitan City of Bari, Apulia, southern Italy, located on the Adriatic Sea. The local economy mostly depends on tourism, agriculture and fishing.

History
The area has been settled since prehistoric times, evidenced by archaeological excavations in the locality of Santa Barbara. It is believed to be the site of the ancient Greek city of Neapolis of Apulia. Nowadays, some historians suggest that this latter was one of the two colonies founded during the IV century b.C. by Dionysius II of Syracuse; other sources, instead, claim Julius Caesar as the father of Polignano a Mare, which might have been a central hub along the well-known Via Traiana. Thanks to its strategic position on the Adriatic Sea, it soon became a trade centre, at least until the introduction of a Greek coin bearing the "NEAII" inscription.

The foreign dominations led the town to a greater development and recognition. The Byzantine Empire, in the VI century, turned it into a municipal structure; subsequently, it was dominated by the Normans, who, during the XI century made the local economy thrive by boosting the production of the olive oil. The fortification of the suburb, on the other hand, has plainly to be attributed to the Angioinians, who secured the protection of the land from potential threats including the Turkish army and the different kinds of epidemics.

Under the Aragonese crown, Polignano reached its peak in both economic and cultural terms; this meant business men and merchants coming from different parts of the world meeting there soon afterwards.

Landmarks 
 Fondazione Museo "Pino Pascali"
 Palazzo dell'Orologio
 Abbey of San Vito Martire
Church of Santa Maria Assunta
The Grotta Palazzese Hotel
Lama Monachile

Transport
Polignano a Mare is served by Polignano a Mare railway station.

Twin towns

 San Miniato, Italy
 Forio, Italy

References

External links

Official website
Viaggiare in Puglia (Italian)
ProLoco Polignano

Cities and towns in Apulia
Coastal towns in Apulia